Lamellibrachia luymesi is a species of tube worms in the family Siboglinidae. It lives at deep-sea cold seeps where hydrocarbons (oil and methane) are leaking out of the seafloor. It is entirely reliant on internal, sulfide-oxidizing bacterial symbionts for its nutrition. These are located in a centrally located "trophosome".

Lamellibrachia luymesi provides the bacteria with hydrogen sulfide and oxygen by taking them up from the environment and binding them to a specialized hemoglobin molecule. Unlike the tube worms Riftia pachyptila that live at hydrothermal vents, L. luymesi uses a posterior extension of its body called the root to take up hydrogen sulfide from the seep sediments. L. luymesi may also help fuel the generation of sulfide by excreting sulfate through their roots into the sediments below the aggregations.

To support the carbon fixation they need for maintenance and growth, L. luymesi needs to extract sulfide, oxygen, and inorganic carbon from its environment and supply them to its symbionts in the trophosome via the vascular system. It also needs to ensure that  no build up of the sulfate and hydrogen ion waste products occurs, which would inhibit the bacterial activity. Laboratory experiments have shown that although some of the waste products diffuse into the water column, about 85% of the sulfate produced and about 67% of the hydrogen ions are eliminated across the roots.

The most well-known seeps where L. luymesi lives are in the northern Gulf of Mexico from 500 to 800 m depth. This tube worm can reach lengths over 3 m (10 ft), and grows very slowly, and its longevity is over 250 years. It forms biogenic habitat by creating large aggregations of hundreds to thousands of individuals. Hydrogen sulfide can be lethal for many marine organisms, and the tubeworms help minimise the sulfide levels and maintain a stable habitat. Living in these aggregations are over 100 different species of animals, including brachiopods, molluscs, sponges, arthropoda, and chordates, many of which are found only at these seeps.

References
This article incorporates a CC-BY-2.5 from references.

Sabellida
Animals described in 1975